Aruba competed at the 2015 World Championships in Athletics in Beijing, China, from 22 to 30 August 2015. One athlete represented Aruba at the event.

Results

(q – qualified, NM – no mark, SB – season best)

Men

References

Nations at the 2015 World Championships in Athletics
World Championships in Athletics
2015